General elections were held in Malta on 20 and 21 October 1917. Two of the eight elected seats were left uncontested.

Background
The elections were held under the Chamberlain Constitution, with members elected from eight single-member constituencies by first-past-the-post voting.

Results
A total of 7,012 people were registered to vote.

References

1917
Malta
1917 in Malta
October 1917 events
1917 elections in the British Empire